Nossa Senhora do Pópulo (full name: Caldas da Rainha — Nossa Senhora do Pópulo) is a former civil parish in the municipality of Caldas da Rainha, Portugal. In 2013, the parish merged into the new parish Caldas da Rainha — Nossa Senhora do Pópulo, Coto e São Gregório.

Along with Santo Onofre, Nossa Senhora do Pópulo was one of the two parishes which make up the city of Caldas da Rainha.

References

Former parishes of Caldas da Rainha